Emmanouil Lampakis (1859–1909) was a Greek painter, a member of the academic Munich School of the 19th century.

Life

Emmanouil Lampakis was born in Athens in 1859.
He studied at the Athens School of Fine Arts.
In 1881 he went to Munich under a scholarship and studied at the Munich Academy under Nikolaos Gyzis.
He returned from Munich in 1885, and in July 1886 exhibited two genre works at the Mela Hotel in Kifissia. 
In 1889 he assisted in restoration of mosaics at the Daphni Monastery, and exhibited a genre painting and a portrait of his mother at the Exposition Universelle in Paris. He received a first prize for the portrait.
In 1893 he was elected president of the Christian Archaeological Society.
He continued to exhibit in group and solo exhibitions, and earned a growing reputation.
He taught at the Athens School of Fine Arts from 1903 to 1907.
He died in Athens in 1909.

Work

Lampakis was deeply influenced by Gysis.
He painted portraits, genre scenes and religious works characterized by low-key simplicity and sensitivity.
He was praised for his use of perspective.
Two of his paintings are held by the National Gallery of Greece.

Notes

Sources

1859 births
1909 deaths
Artists from Athens
19th-century Greek painters
20th-century Greek painters
Munich School
Academic staff of the Athens School of Fine Arts